Yaoki is a Moon rover made by Japanese company Dymon to be launched in 2023 by American company Astrobotic Technology on their Peregrine lunar lander. Yaoki was first announced in 2019.

Yaoki weighs 498g and transportation to the Moon costs $1.2 million per kilogram.

Name
Yaoki refers to the Japanese proverb "Nana korobi ya oki" (jap.: 七転び八起き).
This proverb means "To get back up again and again, no matter how many times you fail" (literally: "Seven times falling down, eight times rising up").

Dymon
Yaoki is developed by Dymon Co. Ltd., which is led by robot creator Shinichiro Nakajima. As an automobile engineer, Nakajima also worked on the development of Audi's four-wheel drive system “quattro”, which was said to be the best on the ground. Dymon was founded by him with the aim of developing the ultimate mobility.
Dymon means big gate in Japanese.

Cooperation with the Artemis Program and SpaceBit

Artemis Program 
As a forerunner in NASA’s lunar development project, the Artemis Program, Yaoki, with its light footwork, aims to contribute to the field of mobility systems.

SpaceBit 
During The 3rd International Moon Village Workshop & Symposium in Kyoto on December 5–8, 2019, Spacebit signed an agreement with Japanese-based space company Dymon on technical and mission collaboration within the next trip to Moon in July 2021.

First, from the technical side, Spacebit and Dymon will cooperate on the Moon as their Lunar rovers Asagumo and Yaoki will communicate with the Earth via Astrobotic lander. Within this mission cooperation, Spacebit and Dymon rovers will take each other's photo on the Moon using their own cameras.

Note that earlier in 2019, Spacebit and Dymon signed an agreement to deliver their first lunar rovers Asagumo and Yaoki on Astrobotic's upcoming Peregrine mission in 2021. Astrobotic's Peregrine lunar lander will be launched on a Vulcan Centaur rocket from Space Launch Complex-41 at Cape Canaveral Air Force Station in Florida.

Partners
Nihon Unist
UNIT Co
Pixies Inc.
UCHIDA Co
Kokko Shisetsu Kogyo Co.
Mitsubishi Chemical Corporation
Kyushu Institute of Technology

References

Videos
YAOKI This little remote robot goes to the Moon in 2021
Lunar rover YAOKI "The Birth"/ 月面探査車 YAOKI 「誕生編」
Lunar rover YAOKI "Meet HOPE in Tanegashima" / 月面探査車 YAOKI 「種子島でHOPEに会う」
Lunar rover YAOKI "IAC2019 to Astrobotic" / 月面探査車 YAOKI 「IAC2019 to Astrobotic」
月面ロボ YAOKI 「不死身なり」
【月面探査YAOKI】スタートアップ説明会に行ってきました！
Lunar rover YAOKI "Autumn in Kyoto" / 月面探査車 YAOKI 「京都の秋」
Lunar rover YAOKI "CEATEC2019" / 月面探査車 YAOKI 「CEATEC2019」
Lunar rover YAOKI "SORA-FES ABLab" / 月面探査車 YAOKI 「宙フェス ABLab」
月面へ夢のせて 町工場発の小型探査ロボ

Peregrine Payloads
Artemis program